Coin Act may refer to

 Coin Act 1696, Act of the Parliament of England
 Coin Act 1732, Act of the Parliament of Great Britain
 Coin Act 1816, Act of the Parliament of the United Kingdom